AWeb is a web browser for the Amiga range of computers. Originally developed by Yvon Rozijn, AWeb was shipped with version 3.9 of AmigaOS, and is now open source.

AWeb supports HTML 3.2, and some 4.01, JavaScript, frames, SSL, and various other Netscape and Internet Explorer features.

Awards/Press

Amiga Computing, December 96 issue, Overall rating of 89%.
Amiga User International, January 97 issue, rating of 95%.
CU Amiga, November 1996 issue, rating of 91%.

See also

 AMosaic
 IBrowse
 Voyager

References

External links
AWeb II Website 
Unofficial AWeb for AOS 3.x / AOS4 / MorphOS

Free web browsers
Web browsers for AmigaOS
MorphOS software
1996 software
Discontinued web browsers